Kiten Point (‘Nos Kiten’ \'nos 'ki-ten\) is the point forming the south side of the entrance to Chudomir Cove on the Trinity Peninsula coast of Prince Gustav Channel, Weddell Sea in Antarctica.

The point is “named after the town of Kiten in southeastern Bulgaria, and in connection with the freezer vessel Kiten of the Bulgarian company Ocean Fisheries – Burgas whose ships operated in the waters of South Georgia, Kerguelen, the South Orkney Islands, South Shetland Islands and Antarctic Peninsula from 1970 to the early 1990s.  The Bulgarian fishermen, along with those of the Soviet Union, Poland and East Germany are the pioneers of modern Antarctic fishing industry.”

Location
German-British mapping in 1996.

Maps
 Trinity Peninsula. Scale 1:250000 topographic map No. 5697. Institut für Angewandte Geodäsie and British Antarctic Survey, 1996.
 Antarctic Digital Database (ADD). Scale 1:250000 topographic map of Antarctica. Scientific Committee on Antarctic Research (SCAR). Since 1993, regularly updated.

Notes

References
 Bulgarian Antarctic Gazetteer. Antarctic Place-names Commission. (details in Bulgarian, basic data in English)
 Kiten Point. SCAR Composite Antarctic Gazetteer

External links
 Kiten Point. Copernix satellite image

Headlands of Trinity Peninsula
Bulgaria and the Antarctic